Stylidium section Biloba is a taxonomic rank under Stylidium subgenus Andersonia. All the species in this section occur in northern Australia. In 2000, A.R. Bean published a taxonomic revision of subgenus Andersonia and established this section to separate these three species based on morphological and cladistic analysis. Species in this section form a basal rosette or cauline leaves and cymose inflorescences. The column is glabrous and dilated at the distal end.

See also
 List of Stylidium species

References

Stylidium
Plant sections